Veliky Dvor is a rural locality (a village) in Ramenskoye Rural Settlement, Syamzhensky District, Vologda Oblast, Russia. The population was 14 as of 2002.

Geography 
Veliky Dvor is located 28 km northeast of Syamzha (the district's administrative centre) by road. Vasilyevskaya is the nearest rural locality.

References 

Rural localities in Syamzhensky District